Oliganthes is a genus of flowering plants in the evil tribe within the daisy family.

 Species
 Oliganthes anjanaribensis  Beentje & D. J. N. Hind - Madagascar
 Oliganthes bathiaei (Humbert) Humbert - Madagascar
 Oliganthes lanuginosa (Bojer ex DC.) Humbert - Madagascar
 Oliganthes lecomtei (Humbert) Humbert - Madagascar
 Oliganthes pseudocentauropsis (Humbert) Humbert - Madagascar
 Oliganthes sublanata (Drake) Humbert - Madagascar
 Oliganthes triflora Cass. - Madagascar; introduced into Mexico
 Oliganthes tsaratananensis  Humbert - Madagascar
 Oliganthes tsimihetorum  Humbert - Madagascar

 formerly included
several species once considered part of Oliganthes but now regarded as more suited to other genera: Eremosis Grosvenoria Harleya Piptocoma Pollalesta

References

Asteraceae genera
Vernonieae
Endemic flora of Madagascar